Raaj Tilak (coronation) is a 1984 Indian Hindi-language film directed by Rajkumar Kohli, starring Dharmendra, Raaj Kumar, Sunil Dutt, Hema Malini, Kamal Haasan, Reena Roy, Ranjeeta Kaur, Yogeeta Bali, Sarika, Pran, Ranjeet, Raj Kiran and Ajit. The music was composed by Kalyanji-Anandji

Plot 

The local King has many enemies including his own trusted men, Bhavani Singh and Ranjeet. But the King always has the help of Samadh Khan, and the King's brother-in-law, Arjun Singh. Now the King's newborn son is abducted by Jalal Khan and Samadh Khan is branded a traitor. Jalal turns the prince to a local gypsy band. The queen is devastated over the disappearance of her son, but Arjun offers his son for her, but Bhavani finds out this move and switches his son with Arjun's son. Years later, now the Prince, Shamsher Singh is like Bhavani and has all bad habits. He soon imprisons his very own mother and inflicts all kinds of atrocities on common people. Arjun attempts to intervene but is imprisoned. The climax shows whether the real prince surfaces now for revenge, or will he continue as gypsy without knowing his true heritage?.

Cast 

Dharmendra as Zorawar Singh
Hema Malini as Roopa Singh
Raaj Kumar as Samadh Khan
Sunil Dutt as Jai Singh
Kamal Haasan as Suraj Singh
Sarika
Reena Roy as Madhumati Singh
Ranjeeta Kaur as Sapna
Yogeeta Bali as Nazma Khan
Raza Murad as Jalal Khan
Raj Kiran as Shamsher Singh
Madan Puri as Ranjeet Singh
Ajit as Bhavani Singh
Pran as Arjun Singh
Om Prakash as Sardar Zuberi
Jamuna as Rajmata
Mohan Choti
Jankidas Mehra
Dev Kumar as Gypsy king
Praveen Kumar Sobti

Soundtrack

Box office 

Raaj Tilak was a box office success.

References

External links 

 Raj Tilak at jointscene

1984 films
1980s Hindi-language films
Indian action films
Films scored by Kalyanji Anandji
Films about royalty
1984 action films
Hindi-language action films